Celatoblatta is a genus of cockroaches in the family Blattidae with species from Australia, New Zealand and New Caledonia.

It contains the following species:

Celatoblatta anisoptera Johns, 1966
Celatoblatta baldwinspenceri (Mackerras, 1968)
Celatoblatta fuscipes Johns, 1966
Celatoblatta hesperia Johns, 1966
Celatoblatta immunda (Shelford, 1911)
Celatoblatta laevispinata Johns, 1966
Celatoblatta marksae (Mackerras, 1968)
Celatoblatta montana Johns, 1966
Celatoblatta nigrifrons (Chopard, 1924)
Celatoblatta notialis Johns, 1966
Celatoblatta onata (Princis, 1954)
Celatoblatta pallidicauda Johns, 1966
Celatoblatta papuae (Shaw, 1925)
Celatoblatta peninsularis Johns, 1966
Celatoblatta perpolita (Mackerras, 1968)
Celatoblatta punctipennis (Chopard, 1924)
Celatoblatta quadriloba (Mackerras, 1968)
Celatoblatta quinquemaculata Johns, 1966
Celatoblatta sedilloti (Bolívar, 1883)
Celatoblatta shawi (Princis, 1966)
Celatoblatta shelfordi (Shaw, 1925)
Celatoblatta subcorticaria Johns, 1966
Celatoblatta tryoni (Shaw, 1925)
Celatoblatta undulivitta (Walker, 1868)
Celatoblatta vulgaris Johns, 1966
Celatoblatta yemenica Bey-Bienko, 1969
Celatoblatta zonata (Princis, 1954)

References 

Blattidae
Insects of New Zealand
Insects of Australia
Insects of New Caledonia